The Graian Alps are a mountain range in the western part of the Alps.

Etymology
The name Graie comes from the Graioceli Celtic tribe, which dwelled in the area surrounding the Mont Cenis pass and the Viù valley.
Other sources claim that the name comes from the Celtic "Graig" meaning rock/stone, literally the Rocky Mountains

Geography 
The Graian Alps are located in France (Auvergne-Rhône-Alpes), Italy (Piedmont and the Aosta Valley), and Switzerland (western Valais).

The French side of the Graian Alps is drained by the river Isère (Tarentaise valley) and its tributary Arc (Maurienne valley), and by the Arve. The Italian side is drained by the rivers Dora Riparia, Dora Baltea, Orco and Stura di Lanzo, tributaries of the Po.

The Graian Alps can also be divided into the following four groups:

 the Mont Blanc group (north of the Little St Bernard Pass), including the Beaufortain Massif
 the Central group (the watershed between the Little St Bernard Pass and the Col du Mont Cenis)
 the Western or French group,
 and the Eastern or Italian group.

Peaks
The main peaks of the Graian Alps are:

Mont Blanc group

Central group

Eastern group

Western group

Passes

The main passes of the Graian Alps are shown in the table below. The group in which the pass is located is indicated with "MB" for Mont Blanc group, "C" for Central group, "E" for Eastern group, and "W" for Western group.

Nature conservation 

The western group contains the Vanoise National Park, established in 1972 and covering  the eastern group contains the Gran Paradiso National Park, the oldest Italian national park.
Also on the Italian side is located the Parco Regionale del Monte Avic, a nature park of 5,747 ha established by Regione Valle d'Aosta.

Maps
 Italian official cartography (Istituto Geografico Militare - IGM); on-line version: www.pcn.minambiente.it
 French official cartography (Institut Géographique National - IGN); on-line version:  www.geoportail.fr
 Swiss official cartography (Swiss Federal Office of Topography - Swisstopo); on-line version:  map.geo.admin.ch

See also
 Mont Blanc Massif
 Vanoise Massif
 Swiss Alps

References

External links 

 Ascents in Gran Paradiso group - Czech and English
 Graian Alps on Summitpost - English

 
Mountain ranges of the Alps
Mountain ranges of Auvergne-Rhône-Alpes
Mountain ranges of Italy
Mountain ranges of Switzerland
Mountain ranges of Piedmont